Charis Grammos (born 1948) is a former Greek football player of the 1960s–1970s era.

Career
Born in Mytilene, Lesbos, Grammos began playing football as a winger for Achilleas Mytilene until he was acquired in 1966 by Panathinaikos for 600,000 drachmas, at a time when the "greens" were looking for young players to replace six of the older stars that had rebelled against coach Stjepan Bobek.

Grammos played as right forward or right midfielder. He was a mainstay for Panathinaikos for the next 10 years and was a member of the team that played at 1971 European Cup Final in Wembley Stadium. Later in his career, he played for Olympiakos, becoming one of the few players that made the cross-over between the two "eternal enemies". Grammos made a total of 215 appearances in the Alpha Ethniki.

References

This page uses content from the Phantis Wiki. The original content was at Harris Grammos and is available under the GNU Free Documentation License. The list of authors can be seen in the page history.

1948 births
Living people
Greek footballers
Panathinaikos F.C. players
Olympiacos F.C. players
Super League Greece players
Association football forwards
People from Mytilene
Sportspeople from the North Aegean